Jol-Bulak, formerly known as Sovetskoye, is a village in the Kemin District of the Chüy Region of Kyrgyzstan. Its population was 1,146 in 2021.

References

Populated places in Chüy Region